Gracjan Horoszkiewicz (born 18 March 1995) is a Polish professional footballer who plays as a defender for SV Askania Schipkau.

Club career 
A product of Hertha BSC youth academy, Horoszkiewicz kicked off his career with reserves in 2011, playing till 2014. At the end of the contract he was linked with a move to Serie A with AS Roma. He instead joined Cracovia Kraków, but was released only after 3 months. After being released, he signed for Podbeskidzie Bielsko-Biała.

International career
Horoszkiewicz made his debut for Poland U21 against Italy U21.

References

External links 
 
 
 Gracjan Horoszkiewicz at FuPa

1995 births
Living people
Polish footballers
Polish expatriate footballers
Hertha BSC II players
MKS Cracovia (football) players
Podbeskidzie Bielsko-Biała players
ZFC Meuselwitz players
Chrobry Głogów players
Bałtyk Gdynia players
Regionalliga players
I liga players
Ekstraklasa players
Association football defenders
Poland youth international footballers
Poland under-21 international footballers
People from Głogów
Sportspeople from Lower Silesian Voivodeship
Polish expatriate sportspeople in Germany
Expatriate footballers in Germany